
There are over 20,000 Grade II* listed buildings in England.  This page is a list of the 17 Grade II listed buildings in the district of Epsom and Ewell in Surrey.  For links to similar articles in relation to the other 10 districts of Surrey see Grade II* listed buildings in Surrey.

|}

Notes

References 
English Heritage Images of England

Epsom and Ewell
 Epsom and Ewell
Epsom and Ewell